Fast Bullets is a 1936 American Western film directed by Harry S. Webb and starring Tom Tyler, Rex Lease and Margaret Nearing. It was the 14th of Tom Tyler's 18 Westerns for Reliable Pictures.

Plot
The Texas Rangers are hot on the trail of the Travis gang that have killed two Rangers.  Ranger Sgt. Tom Milton apprehends two members of the gang, then turning them over to his Ranger companion, chases after the third, young Jimmy. Instead of shooting Jimmy, Tom talks him into going on the straight and narrow by his helping Tom infiltrate the Travis gang who are smuggling explosives.

One of the outlaws Tom arrested escapes and informs Travis that Tom is actually a Texas Ranger. Travis uses Tom to ambush a column of Rangers.

Cast
 Tom Tyler as Sgt. Tom Milton
 Rex Lease as Jimmy 
 Margaret Nearing as Joan 
 Al Bridge as Travis 
 William Gould as Captain Drummond 
 Robert Walker as Frank 
 Jimmy Aubrey as Jake 
 Slim Whitaker as Pat
 Charles King as Bill
 George Chesebro as Saloon tough

Production
Filming of Fast Bullets began in early November, 1934.

References

Bibliography
 Pitts, Michael R. Poverty Row Studios, 1929–1940: An Illustrated History of 55 Independent Film Companies, with a Filmography for Each. McFarland & Company, 2005.

External links
 

1936 films
1936 Western (genre) films
1930s English-language films
American Western (genre) films
Films directed by Harry S. Webb
Reliable Pictures films
American black-and-white films
1930s American films